Stefan Pettersson (born June 19, 1977 in Farsta, Sweden) is a Swedish professional ice hockey player with Södertälje SK in the Swedish elite league Elitserien.

Playing career 
Pettersson is a hardworking, quick forward with a powerful and well-aimed shot. During his career he has played for four clubs in the Stockholm area; Huddinge IK, Hammarby IF, Haninge HC and Djurgårdens IF. In the 2000–01 season Pettersson played for Linköpings HC and helped the club clinch one of the two promotion spots for play in Sweden's top ice hockey league Elitserien.

Awards 
 Nominated for Elitserien Rookie of the Year in 2002.
 Played in the Elitserien All-Star Game in 2002.

Career statistics

References

External links
 

1977 births
Djurgårdens IF Hockey players
Huddinge IK players
HV71 players
IK Oskarshamn players
Linköping HC players
Living people
People from Södermanland
Södertälje SK players
Ice hockey people from Stockholm
Swedish ice hockey left wingers